Group GT1, also known simply as GT1, was a set of regulations maintained formerly by the Fédération Internationale de l'Automobile (FIA), for Grand Tourer racing. The category was first created in 1993, as the top class of the BPR Global GT Series, and was included in the 24 Hours of Le Mans. It fell under FIA regulation from 1997, after the BPR series came under the control of the FIA, becoming known as the FIA GT Championship. The category was dissolved at the end of 2011. The category may be split into four distinctive eras, from its debut in 1993–1996, 1997–1998, 2000–2009, 2010–2011.

Early years (1993–1996) 

The class which was to become known as "GT1" was first debuted by the ACO (Automobile Club de l'Ouest) at the 1993 24 Hours of Le Mans, under the name Group GT. The class was first defined in the FIA Appendix J regulations, as Group GT, in 1993. 

In 1994, following the collapse of the FIA World Sportscar Championship in 1992, BPR Global GT series was founded by Jürgen Barth, Patrick Peter, and Stephane Ratel (with their last names forming the name of series organizer BPR), as a championship for privateers, with 4 Hour Long Endurance Races. Barth, an ex Le Mans winner, was manager of the customer competitions department at Porsche, Peter was a well-respected race promoter, while Ratel was an executive/investor in the Venturi GT1 project. The Series had 4 Categories, namely GT1-4, with each decreasing number signifying increased freedom in its technical regulations. By 1996 however, the championship had grown, with the grids of the championship growing due to an influx of cars from several makes in the top GT1 class, such as the McLaren F1 GTR, and the new Porsche 911 GT2 Evolution based on the new 993 chassis, which replaced the 964 platform 911 Carrera RSRs that had once dominated the series grids. In addition, professional teams had also begun to enter the championship that had once been intended for privateers, which caused costs to increase dramatically. Porsche even sent in a factory team to several rounds, with its 911 GT1, which was thought by most in the series paddock as being built against of the spirit of the rules, due to the fact that it was a Porsche 962 with just the front of the chassis being shared with a Type 993 911, and it having a street variant simply for the sake of meeting its homologation requirement. The homologation special method was not new however, with Porsche having already earlier collaborated with Dauer Sportwagen to race the Dauer 962 Le Mans in 1994 (at the time of homologation, only one road car existed) to effectively score the last Le Mans victory for the Porsche 962 series, and Toyota heavily modifying the Toyota MR2 into the SARD MC8-R for the following year's race, also joined by a more pure road derived Toyota Supra and national rivals Nissan Skyline GT-R (both of which had also competed in JGTC with identical specifications) and Honda NSX that year.

Prototype years (1997–1998) 

Following the loss of Patrick Peter from the BPR Organisation, the BPR Organisation evolved into the Stephane Ratel Organisation, with the SRO now co-organising the championship with the FIA. With this change, it saw an even larger influx of professional teams and manufacturers, with the whole grid of the GT1 class consisting of nothing but professional teams. The 1997 season saw the entry of the Mercedes-AMG Team, who would debut the CLK GTR. Similar to the 911 GT1, the CLK GTR was yet another homologation special prototype, with the car only being a racing-version of a production Grand Tourer in name. The car had no street legal version even built by the time the category collapsed in 1999,  and shared only the instrumentation, front grille and the four headlamps with the normal CLK (C208). That same season, realising that the F1 GTR would not be competitive against the homologation specials, McLaren also updated the bodywork of the car, with the alterations so significant that they were forced to build a road car with the updated bodywork, effectively turning the car into a homologation special. The resulting car was known as the F1 GT, with 3 being built. In 1998, realising that with the introduction of the updated CLK LM, and the 911 GT1-98, the F1 GTR could no longer be competitive, McLaren withdrew backing from the program, following BMW which had done so the previous year, in 1997, although 2 cars would still be entered by Parabolica Motorsports and Davidoff Classic.  In 1999, following the total domination of the Mercedes-AMG team in the Championship in the previous season, which saw them win all races in the championship, with both the CLK GTR and LM, no GT1 teams entered the category, apart from the Mercedes-AMG Team. As such, the FIA chose to run the 1999 FIA GT Championship with just the GT2 class.

GTS "GT1" (2000–2009) 

Following the omission of the original GT1 category in the 1999 season, the FIA GT Championship was restructured, such that original GT2 class would be elevated to the top class of the championship, and become known as GT while a new class, N-GT would be the lower class in the championship. The equivalent of this in ACO sanctioned Championships would be the GTS class, and the GT class. In 2005, both classes would become renamed as "GT1" and "GT2" respectively. The Maserati MC12 would be the dominant car of this era, with it earning 5 consecutive teams titles from 2006-2009 for the Vitaphone Racing Team in the FIA GT Championship.

List of FIA GT1 cars

References 

Racing car classes
Sports car racing
Fédération Internationale de l'Automobile
Grand tourers